Proletarsky is a rural locality (a settlement) and the administrative center of Denisovskoye Rural Settlement, Gorokhovetsky District, Vladimir Oblast, Russia. The population was 1,261 as of 2010. There are 22 streets.

Geography 
Proletarsky is located 30 km southwest of Gorokhovets (the district's administrative centre) by road. Denisovo is the nearest rural locality.

References 

Rural localities in Gorokhovetsky District